The Temple of Flora was an ancient sanctuary on the Circus Maximus in Ancient Rome, erected in 238 BCE and dedicated to the goddess Flora.

History
In 240 B.C.E, the festival Floralia was introduced in Rome on the advice of the Sibylline books, and two years later a temple was erected, also with the support of the Sibylline books. Because of their sexual connotations, the festival and the cult centered in the temple of Flora were abhorred by the Christians, who attempted to have the popular worship discredited by claiming that it had been founded in honor of a prostitute. The cult was likely suppressed in the 4th-century during the persecution of pagans in the late Roman Empire, when the sanctuary would have been closed.

See also
List of Ancient Roman temples

References

Roman temples by deity
3rd-century BC religious buildings and structures
Destroyed temples